There have been Arabs in Spain since the early 8th century when the Umayyad conquest of the Iberian Peninsula  created the state of Al-Andalus. In modern times there are expatriates from a range of Arab countries, particularly Morocco, Algeria, Lebanon, Syria, the Palestinian Territories, and Iraq; and also small groups from Egypt, Tunisia, Libya, Jordan and Sudan. As a result of the Arab Spring (Libyan Civil War and Syrian Civil War), many have the status of refugees or illegal immigrants, trying to immigrate especially to France, Germany and Sweden.
The Arab population in Spain is estimated to be between 702,000 (lower estimate) and 1,600,000 - 1,800,000 (higher estimate).

See also

 Arab diaspora
 Arabs in Europe
 Moroccans in Spain
 Lebanese diaspora
 Syrian diaspora
 Palestinian diaspora
 Moroccan diaspora
 Iraqi diaspora
 Egyptian diaspora

References

 
Spain
African diaspora in Spain
Asian diaspora in Spain
Spanish people of Arab descent
Ethnic groups in Spain
Islam in Spain
Muslim communities in Europe